Tavish is a masculine given name. It is a form of the given name Thomas.

Tavish is a Sanskrit word which means strong, energetic, courageous, forceful.

Tavish, in Hindi, means "Heaven" or "Swarg".

Scottish Gaelic forms of Thomas include Tàmhas and Tòmas.

People
Tavish Finnegan Degroot: fictional character from the 2007 video game Team Fortress 2
Tavish Scott (b. 1966): Scottish politician

See also
MacTavish (disambiguation), a related surname
McTavish (disambiguation)